James Edward Bye (born 23 February 1984) is an English actor who has portrayed the role of Martin Fowler in EastEnders since 2014. He competed in the twentieth series of Strictly Come Dancing.

Early and personal life 
Bye was born on 23 February 1984 in Basingstoke. He attended the Hurst Community College, a secondary school in Baughurst. He later went on to study at Queen Mary's College in Basingstoke. Bye is married to wife Victoria Bye; the couple have three sons.

Career 
Bye's first acting appearance was in The Bill as Tom Burrows in 2006. He later went on to appear in Cemetery Junction in 2010, with later appearances in films Hummingbird (2013) and The Great Train Robbery (2013). Then in 2014, he appeared in The Hooligan Factory as Pete the Killer. In October 2014, Bye was cast in the role of Martin Fowler in the BBC One soap opera EastEnders. On 12 August 2022, it was announced that Bye would be competing in the twentieth series of Strictly Come Dancing.

Filmography

Awards and nominations

References

External links

 

1984 births
21st-century English male actors
English male soap opera actors
English male television actors
Living people
Male actors from Hampshire
Participants in British reality television series
People from Basingstoke